Microlophus tigris, the tiger Pacific iguana, is a species of lava lizard endemic to Peru.

References

tigris
Lizards of South America
Endemic fauna of Peru
Reptiles of Peru
Reptiles described in 1845
Taxa named by Johann Jakob von Tschudi